Chatchawal Kong-udom (born 12 November 1943), also known as Chat Taopoon, is a Thai business tycoon and politician. He is known as a chao pho (godfather) in Bangkok's underground gambling industry, and is an influential local figure in the Tao Pun area of Bangkok's Bang Sue District. He served as an elected senator for Bangkok from 2000 to 2006, and headed the Siam Rath newspaper.

Chatchawal founded the Thai Local Power Party in 2012. It contested the 2019 general election, and is expected to win two or three party-list seats according to unofficial calculations.

References

Chatchawal Kong-udom
Chatchawal Kong-udom
Chatchawal Kong-udom
Chatchawal Kong-udom
Chatchawal Kong-udom
Chatchawal Kong-udom
Chatchawal Kong-udom
1943 births
Living people